Celmisia walkeri, also known as Celmisia webbiana,  is a sub-shrub in the genus Celmisia with spreading, semi- decumbent, woody stems and terminal rosettes of linear-oblong gray-green leaves.

Celmisia walkeri is in the hardiness zone 9–10, and can only live in heat zones 9 and 10. Celmisia is a very tropical and heat tolerant plant.

Celmisia walkeri is native to New Zealand, hence its common name is a New Zealand daisy.

References

walkeri
Flora of New Zealand
Plants described in 1877